

People
Darwin Kastle (born 1971) Magic: The Gathering player
Leonard Kastle (1929–2011) opera composer
Richard Kastle (born 1958) pianist

Things
Washington Kastles, professional tennis team in Washington, D.C.
Kastle-Meyer test